Taming the Wild, also known as Madcap, is a 1936 American Western film directed by Bob Hill for producer Sam Katzman's poverty row studio Victory Pictures and starring Rod La Rocque.

Plot
Madcap society girl June Bolton has a talent for trouble. Trying to evade a subpoena in connection with one of her misadventures, she winds up in jail and has to be bailed out by the family attorney, Dick Clayton. But June is soon in trouble again, this time involved with a mob boss and a shady lady. Exasperated by his wealthy client's reckless escapades, Clayton determines to quit... until he realizes he has fallen in love.

Cast
Rod La Rocque as Dick Clayton
Maxine Doyle as June Bolton
Bryant Washburn as Bert Graham
Barbara Pepper as Hazel White
Donald Kerr as Reporter Jimmy Taylor
Zella Russell as Mrs. Bolton
Reed Howes as Chuck
Vincent Dennis as Red
Budd Buster as Henchman (uncredited)
Jack Chefe as Headwaiter (uncredited)
Olin Francis as Hotel Knickerbocker Doorman (uncredited)
Fred Parker as Husband (uncredited)
Forrest Taylor as Police Captain (uncredited)

External links

Taming the Wild at BFI
Taming the Wild at TCMDB

1936 films
Films directed by Robert F. Hill
1936 Western (genre) films
American Western (genre) films
American black-and-white films
1930s English-language films
1930s American films